Sphodromantis gestri is a species of praying mantis found in Kenya and Somalia.

See also
African mantis
List of mantis genera and species

References

G
Mantodea of Africa
Insects of Kenya
Insects of Somalia
Insects described in 1912